Middlesex (also known as Middlesex—London—Lambton) was a federal electoral district represented in the House of Commons of Canada from 1968 to 1979. It was located in the province of Ontario. This riding was created in 1966 from parts of Lambton West, Lambton—Kent, Middlesex West and Middlesex East ridings.

It consisted of:
(a) the north-central part of the City of London bounded by Adelaide Street on the west,  Clarke Side Road  on the east by, and Cheapside Street on the south;

(b) in the County of Middlesex, the Townships of Adelaide, Caradoc, Delaware, Ekfrid, Lobo, Metcalfe, Mosa, West Nissouri and West Williams, Westminster, North Dorchester (excluding the Village of Belmont), East Williams (excluding the Village of Ailsa Craig), and the Township of London (excluding the part of the Township lying south of the Fanshawe Road and bounded on the east by Crumlin Road and on the west by Clarke Side Road); and

(c) in the County of Lambton, the Town of Forest and the Townships of Bosanquet and Warwick.

The electoral district changed name in 1974 to "Middlesex—London—Lambton", and was abolished in 1976 when it was redistributed between Lambton—Middlesex, London East and Middlesex East ridings.

Members of Parliament

This riding has elected the following Members of Parliament:

Election results

Middlesex

|}

|}

Middlesex—London—Lambton

|}

See also 

 List of Canadian federal electoral districts
 Past Canadian electoral districts

External links 
 Parliamentary website: Middlesex
 Parliamentary website: Middelsex—London—Lambton 

 

Former federal electoral districts of Ontario